Panther Creek High School is a public high school located 8 miles south of Valera, Texas, United States, on FM 503; it is classified as a 1A school by the University Interscholastic League. It is part of the Panther Creek Consolidated Independent School District located in southwestern Coleman County. It is a 1985 consolidation of Talpa-Centennial and Mozelle. In 2019, the school was rated "met standard" by the Texas Education Agency.

Athletics
The Panther Creek Panthers compete in these sports:

Basketball
Cross-country running
Six-man football
Golf
Tennis
Track and field
volleyball

State titles

Football - 
1992(6M), 1993(6M), 2000(6M)

References

External links
Panther Creek CISD

Schools in Coleman County, Texas
Public high schools in Texas
Public middle schools in Texas